Sêrtar County or Serthar County is a county in the northwest of Sichuan Province, China, bordering Qinghai province to the north. It is one of the 18 counties under the administration of the Garzê Tibetan Autonomous Prefecture, covering some 9,340 square kilometres. Sêrtar, which means "golden freedom" in Tibetan, lies in the southeast of the Tibetan Plateau and in the historical region of Kham. The vast majority of the population is Tibetan, followed by Han Chinese.

Sêrtar comprises 17 towns and 66 villages. It is home to the Larung Gar Buddhist Institute, the largest Tibetan Buddhist institute in the world. The institute, which was founded by lama Jigme Phuntsok in 1980 and started off with just a few monks, now houses tens of thousands of monks and pilgrims from around the world, which constitute the vast majority of the Sêrtar population. Most monks spend six to 13 years completing their training. The institute, divided into two main segments and spread over just a few square kilometres, is located in a valley and around 15 kilometres from the town of Sêrtar. A permit is occasionally required for non-Chinese nationals to enter the institute.

Sêrtar is remotely located and requires more than half a day's driving if travelling from Chengdu via Maerkang. It is also possible to travel from Xining, the capital of Qinghai. Sêrtar is at an altitude of around 4,100 metres above sea level. Temperatures range from 30 degrees Celsius in the summer and -25 degrees Celsius in the winter.

Incidents
Sêrtar is one of the places in Sichuan that witnesses occasional acts of self-immolation, usually carried out by Tibetans. For instance, in February 2012, three herders set themselves on fire, purportedly in protest. On 26 November 2012, a monk allegedly self-immolated in front of the golden horse statue in Larung Gar. The supposedly political motivation behind these acts, however, has always been disputed by the Chinese government.

As many of the houses in Larung Gar are made of wood, they present a constant fire hazard. On the evening of 10 January 2014, a fire broke out in Larung Gar, burning down more than a dozen structures and requiring 450 rescue workers to respond to the scene; however, there were no serious casualties.

Gallery

Panoramas

Climate

References

External links
 

 
Populated places in the Garzê Tibetan Autonomous Prefecture
County-level divisions of Sichuan